André Georges Corap (15 January 1878 – 15 August 1953) was a General in the French Army who fought in World War II. He commanded the 9th Army during the battle of France in 1940.

Early life

Corap was born in Pont Audemer, Normandy. His father was a tailor.

Military career 
In 1898 he graduated from École spéciale militaire de Saint-Cyr and joined the French Army. He commanded colonial troops in Algeria and Morocco. In 1905, he was admitted to the Collège interarmées de défense.

First World War
In 1914, he was a captain in the Zouaves. He spent most of the war working as a staff officer for Generals Foch and Petain.

Interwar
He fought in the Rif War, capturing the leader of the insurgents, Abd el-Krim.

Corap was promoted to Brigadier General in 1929 and Major General in 1933. He was promoted to Lieutenant General in 1935 and given command of 2nd Military Division in 1937.

World War II
In 1939, at the outbreak of war, he was given command of the 9th Army. The 9th Army was placed to cover the Ardennes during the German Blitzkrieg in 1940. Corap was held responsible for the German breakthrough by the French high command and relieved from his post on 19 May 1940. He was retired into the reserves on 1 July 1940.

Sources

 This article is translated from French Wikipedia
 who's who in 20th century warfare
 page from generals.dk
 page from the unofficial website of Ecole supérieure de guerre

1878 births
1953 deaths
French generals
French military personnel of World War I
French military personnel of World War II
École Spéciale Militaire de Saint-Cyr alumni